Nancy Minshew is a Professor of Psychiatry and Neurology at the University of Pittsburgh. She directs the Center of Excellence in Autism Research and is an internationally known expert in the cognitive, neurological, and genetic bases of autism. Minshew was trained as a behavioral child neurologist, and she received an M.D. from the Washington University School of Medicine in St. Louis.

Underconnectivity hypothesis

Minshew and colleague Marcel Just are best known for the underconnectivity hypothesis of autism, which posits that autism is marked by underfunctioning high-level neural connections and synchronization, along with an excess of low-level processes. Evidence for this theory has been found in functional neuroimaging studies on autistic individuals and by a brain wave study that suggested that adults with autism spectrum disorders (ASD) have local overconnectivity in the cortex and weak functional connections between the frontal lobe and the rest of the cortex.

References

External links
Nancy Minshew's Biography
University of Pittsburgh Center for Excellence in Autism Research (CeFAR)
Minshew counters autism fallacy

American neurologists
Women neurologists
American psychiatrists
American women neuroscientists
American neuroscientists
Autism researchers
Living people
University of Pittsburgh faculty
Washington University School of Medicine alumni
Year of birth missing (living people)
American women psychiatrists